James Chance is an American saxophonist.

James Chance may also refer to:

Sir James Timmins Chance, industrialist, philanthropist and pioneering designer of lighthouse optics 
Jimmy Chance, TV sitcom character from Raising Hope

See also
Chance (surname)